Saville is a Booker Prize-winning novel by English writer David Storey.

Plot
The novel centres on Colin, a young boy growing up in the Yorkshire mining village of Saxton during the Second World War and the postwar years.

Awards
Saville won the 1976 Booker Prize for fiction.

References

Booker Prize-winning works
1970 British novels
Novels by David Storey
Novels set in Yorkshire
Jonathan Cape books